Lawat, Amala is a village in Hailakandi district of Assam state of India.

References

Villages in Hailakandi district